Gardak may refer to:
 Gardak, Khash
 Gardak, Qasr-e Qand
 Gardak, Sarbaz